
Gmina Lubichowo is a rural gmina (administrative district) in Starogard County, Pomeranian Voivodeship, in northern Poland.

Villages
Gmina Lubichowo contains the villages and settlements of Bietowo, Budy, Kaliska, Krępki, Kujawy, Lipinki Królewskie, Lubichowo, Mermet, Młynki, Mościska, Ocypel, Osowo Leśne, Pawelec, Plony, Skowronek, Smolniki, Szteklin, Szteklinek, Wda, Wdecki Młyn, Wilcze Błota, Zelgoszcz, Zielona Góra and Ziemianek.

Neighbouring gminas
Gmina Lubichowo is bordered by the gminas of Bobowo, Kaliska, Osieczna, Osiek, Skórcz, Starogard Gdański and Zblewo.

References
 Polish official population figures 2006

Lubichowo
Starogard County